Anatoma yaroni is a species of minute sea snail, a marine gastropod mollusk or micromollusk in the family Anatomidae.

Description
The size of the shell varies between 4 mm and 5 mm. The shell ranges from brown to dark green in color. Though the shell is thin, it is very strong in comparison to other snails.

Distribution
This marine species occurs off Transkei, South Africa.

References

 Geiger D.L. (2012) Monograph of the little slit shells. Volume 1. Introduction, Scissurellidae. pp. 1-728. Volume 2. Anatomidae, Larocheidae, Depressizonidae, Sutilizonidae, Temnocinclidae. pp. 729–1291. Santa Barbara Museum of Natural History Monographs Number 7.

External links
 To Encyclopedia of Life
 To USNM Invertebrate Zoology Mollusca Collection
 To World Register of Marine Species

Anatomidae
Gastropods described in 1986